Vodorazdelnoye is a rural locality (a selo) and the administrative center of Vodorazdelnensky Selsoviet of Seryshevsky District, Amur Oblast, Russia. The population was 230 as of 2018. There are 6 streets.

Geography 
Vodorazdelnoye is located 51 km east of Seryshevo (the district's administrative centre) by road. Milekhino is the nearest rural locality.

References 

Rural localities in Seryshevsky District